Mambilima is a constituency of the National Assembly of Zambia. It covers the towns of Kabila and Mwense in Mwense District of Luapula Province.

List of MPs

References

Constituencies of the National Assembly of Zambia
1991 establishments in Zambia
Constituencies established in 1991